This page lists the World Best Year Performance in the year 2000 in the men's decathlon. The main event during this season were the 2000 Summer Olympics in Sydney, Australia, where the competition started on Wednesday September 27, 2000 and ended on Thursday September 28, 2000.

Records

2000 World Year Ranking

See also
2000 Hypo-Meeting

References
decathlon2000
IAAF
apulanta
IAAF Year Ranking

2000
Decathlon Year Ranking, 2000